Nuvoton Technology Corporation is a Taiwan-based semiconductor company established in 2008. It spun off from Winbond Electronics Corp. as a wholly owned subsidiary.

Overview
Nuvoton's main product lines are microcontroller application IC, audio application IC, cloud & computing IC, and foundry service. Its consumer electronics ICs focus mainly on microcontroller ICs and voice and speech ICs. Its ARM Cortex-M0 microcontroller IC NuMicro family is well known for its density and functionality. Its computer IC product line designs and manufactures the key chips for PC motherboards, laptops, and servers, offering complete super I/O solutions, clock generators, hardware monitoring IC, power management IC, TPM security IC, notebook keyboard controller, and mobile platform embedded controller (EC).

Nuvoton operates a six-inch wafer fab, which provides foundry service for the company's own branded IC products, as well as for selected manufacturing partners.

History
In September 2020, Nuvoton bought Panasonic's chip unit for $250 million in an all-cash transaction. This acquisition will give the company more access to the automobile and automation industries.

See also
 List of companies of Taiwan
 ARM architecture

References

External links
 

2008 establishments in Taiwan
Electronics companies established in 2008
Manufacturing companies based in Hsinchu
Foundry semiconductor companies
Semiconductor companies of Taiwan
Taiwanese brands